This is a list of sovereign states by the date in which they adopted their current national flag.

For most of these states, the date of flag adoption is clear, but for others the exact date of flag adoption is unknown or disputed because of design changes. This list defines the year of flag adoption as the year since when the current flag has been used continuously to represent a nation, autonomous region or occupied state. Only countries which are currently sovereign states are listed, although the flag may have been adopted before the countries gained independence. The listed countries may have undergone fundamental regime changes, great geographical changes or even temporarily lost autonomy, or undergone political unions or secessions. If the flag remained in use during such events, its original adoption date is listed. Changes that do not alter the basic design of the flag, like the changes in ratio or colour shade, restyling of emblems or inscriptions or the addition or removal of stars, are listed in the last column. The current flag design often evolved over the years (e.g. the flag of the United States) or can be a re-adoption of an earlier, historic flag (e.g. the flag of Libya). The year the current flag design first came into use is listed in the third column.

List

See also
Timeline of national flags

Notes

References

Sources
 Sources for most of the dates in this list can be found in the articles on the respective flags or per the Flags of the World database.

 Date
Flag adoption